Fidelity International Ltd, or FIL for short, is a company that provides investment management services including mutual funds, pension management and fund platforms to private and institutional investors. Fidelity International was originally established in 1969 as the international investment subsidiary of Fidelity Investments in Boston before being spun out as an independent business in 1980. Since then, it has continued to operate as a private employee-owned company.

History 
It was established in 1969  as an international investment subsidiary of Fidelity Management & Research, before becoming an independent business in 1980. Today, Fidelity International handles investments for clients in Europe, Canada, EMEA and Asia, while the US-based Fidelity Management and Research handles investments for clients in the USA.

In the same year that it was established, an office was opened in Tokyo, followed by London in 1973, Hong Kong in 1981 and Taipei in 1986. In 1990 the first Continental European office was opened in Amsterdam, when a number of Luxembourg funds for Continental Europe and Asia were launched. Expansion has continued, with Fidelity opening an office in India in 2001 and in China in 2004.

In 2012, chief investment officer Dominic Rossi expressed support for a UK government plan to allow shareholders to veto bonus deals for boardroom members in companies, using what The Guardian called "unusually confrontational language for a major investor more accustomed to operating behind the scenes". Rossi has since campaigned to get UK long-term incentive plans extended from three years to five.

, Fidelity employs over 7,000 people in 24 countries around the world; Australia, Austria, Belgium, Bermuda, Brazil, China (including Hong Kong), Dubai, France, Germany, India, Ireland, Italy, Japan, Korea, Luxembourg, Netherlands, Poland, Singapore, Spain, Sweden, Switzerland, Taiwan, Tunisia and the UK. As of June 30, 2018, London is the company's largest research and investment hub, and the UK is their biggest market.

The company is privately owned; the majority of the company is owned by its employees, though the Johnson family still owns a substantial minority of 39.89% according to regulatory filings.

Services 
Fidelity offers its own funds and, through its platforms in a number of countries, other managers’ funds. It currently manages or administers over US$300bn on behalf of private individuals and institutions around the world, offering investors the opportunity to further their medium and long-term investment goals.

Controversial investments 
Fidelity International has been a major investor in Hikvision and SenseTime, the former a Chinese surveillance technology manufacturer that was sanctioned in 2019 by the U.S. government for enabling human rights abuses in Xinjiang.

References

External links

 
Investment management companies of Bermuda
Financial services companies established in 1969
1969 establishments in Massachusetts